Wyvern is a 2-dimensional Graphical MUD/MMORPG game  which was released for public play on February 4, 2001 by creator Steve Yegge through his company Cabochon Inc. The game was announced to be permanently down on November 24, 2013, but came back in 2016 for iOS and in 2017 for Android. Wyvern is a free game that is influenced by games such as Crossfire and NetHack. Wyvern is designed to be available on many platforms through a pure Java version.

Once users download the game client, they select a character from a collection of fantasy races. Users navigate through the game through a mixture of tapping and text-based commands. Players move throughout the lands of Wyvern, adventuring in areas that were created and modified by moderators known as Wizards.

In 2002, the game won the grand prize of $10,000 in the JPDA 2002 application developers contest, for the Java application which allows PDA users access to the game. It was stated that it won for its "originality and extra innovation" in comparison to the other applications submitted to the contest.

Wyvern's server was shut down, and the game therefore suspended, in April 2011; however, in March 2012, Steve Yegge stated that he was working on rebooting Wyvern, although there were legal issues in the process of doing so. In April 2013, Yegge, having received clearance from Google to use Wyvern as a side project, announced his vision of a cloud-based Wyvern initially to be brought back on a mobile platform. In December 2016, Wyvern was re-released as an iOS game, with Yegge as the sole owner of the game after two years of negotiation with Wyvern's original owners.

In May 2020, creator Steve Yegge left his job at the Singaporean rideshare company Grab to focus his time on completing the game.

References

External links
 
 Official forums

Graphical MUDs
Massively multiplayer online role-playing games
Video games developed in the United States